Between God, the Devil and a Winchester is a 1968 Spaghetti Western film directed by Marino Girolami. The story is based on the 1883 novel Treasure Island by Robert Louis Stevenson.

Cast 
 Richard Harrison as Father Pat Jordan
 Gilbert Roland  as Juan Chasquisdo
 Enio Girolami  as Marco Serraldo
 Folco Lulli  as Colonel Bob Ford
 Raf Baldassarre  as Pedro Batch
 Dominique Boschero  as Marta 
 Roberto Camardiel as Uncle Pink

Release
Between God, the Devil and a Winchester was first distributed in 1968. It was distributed by Fida Cinematografica in Italy.

See also
 List of Italian films of 1968

References

Sources

External links

1968 films
Spaghetti Western films
1968 Western (genre) films
Films directed by Marino Girolami
Films scored by Carlo Savina
Treasure Island films
1960s Italian films